Triptych of the Virgin's Life is an oil on panel painting by the Early Netherlandish painter Dieric Bouts. It was executed circa 1445 and is in the collection of the Museo del Prado, in Madrid.

Description
The triptych comprises four scenes from the life of the Virgin Mary emphasising her role in the Redemption. These are the Annunciation, the Visitation, the Adoration of the Angels, and the Adoration of the Magi. The sculpted portals derive from Rogier van der Weyden's Miraflores Altarpiece. There are strong affinities with Petrus Christus' Washington  Nativity, so much so that the painting was once attributed to Christus. Erwin Panofsky believed the strong connection is evidence that the young Dieric Bouts attached himself to Petrus Christus early in his career.

Gallery

Notes

Bibliography
 Panofsky, Erwin. Early Netherlandish Painting. London: Harper Collins, 1971. 

1440s paintings
Paintings by Dieric Bouts
Paintings of the Museo del Prado by Flemish artists
Paintings depicting the Annunciation
Bouts
Triptychs